is a series of boxing video games created by Genyo Takeda and Makoto Wada, and published by Nintendo. The main protagonist and player character of the series is Little Mac, a short boxer from the Bronx who climbs the ranks of the fictional World Video Boxing Association (WVBA) by challenging various opponents.

Development
Many of the characters in the 1984 title Super Punch-Out!! are similar to each other by design because they are variants of the same programming; the code recycling and the lack of character differentiation outside of crude nationalistic stereotypes is a result of the game's limited development time and storage resources. For example, Soda Popinski's obnoxious laughter is also used for Mr. Sandman, Bald Bull, and Super Macho Man, and in other Nintendo games, such as the Game Over screen of the game Zelda II: The Adventure of Link.

Protagonists

Little Mac 

 is a 17-year-old boxer from the Bronx, New York and the main protagonist of the series. While he is quite small compared to his opponents, he makes up for it with his determination and skill. He was introduced in Mike Tyson's Punch-Out!!, replacing the nameless, green-haired player character from the arcade games. In the NES and Wii versions of Punch-Out!!, he is depicted as having short black hair with a black tank top and green shorts. In the SNES version of Super Punch-Out!!, he has blond hair with blue shorts.

Doc Louis 
 is a former heavyweight boxing champion and Little Mac's trainer, who stands in Mac's corner during fights. Between rounds, Doc provides Mac with advice, encouragement, or sometimes a humorous anecdote. He is the creator of the "Star Punch", the most powerful move in Mac's arsenal. He has a fondness for chocolate. In Punch-Out!! for Wii, he is voiced by Riley Inge. Doc Louis appears as the sole challenger in the Club Nintendo exclusive Doc Louis's Punch-Out!!.

Opponents introduced in Punch-Out!! (1984)

Glass Joe 

 is a French boxer born in Paris. His first appearance was in the arcade game Punch-Out!! in 1984, and three years later appeared in NES video game of the same name. His most recent appearance was in the Wii installment of Punch-Out!!. He was originally designed by Shigeru Miyamoto and was revised by Makoto Wada for the NES game. He is voiced by Christian Bernard in the Wii game.

He is the player's first opponent in every game in which he appears, and is famous for his weakness and cowardice. Glass Joe has a record of 1-99. These elements are considered by critics to be stereotypes of French people. These characteristics were emphasized by the developer of the Wii game which included cutscenes which depict Glass Joe in French settings. Glass Joe is considered one of the most well-known characters in the Punch-Out!! series and a Nintendo icon.

Piston Hurricane 
 is a boxer from Havana, Cuba who originally appeared as the second opponent in the first Punch-Out!! arcade. In the NES and Wii games, Piston Hurricane is replaced by the Japanese boxer Piston Honda, who fights in a similar manner. Piston Hurricane reappeared in the SNES version of Super Punch-Out!!.

Bald Bull
 is a Turkish boxer born in Istanbul, created by Shigeru Miyamoto for the arcade game "Punch-Out!!". His next appearances were in the 1985 arcade game Arm Wrestling as "Mask X", in the 1987 video game Punch-Out!! for NES as Champion of the Major Circuit, in the 1994 video game Super Punch-Out!! and in the 2009 video game Punch-Out!! for Wii. He also made two appearances in the WarioWare series, the first was in "WarioWare: Smooth Moves" with Von Kaiser and the second was in "WarioWare D.I.Y.".

Bald Bull has had generally positive reception. A statue of Bald Bull constructed with Lego blocks was offered as a door prize at the Child's Play charity, along with Mega Man and Sonic the Hedgehog statues. ESPN editor Jon Robinson, in an interview with the Senior Product Specialist of the Wii game, Nate Williams, commented that he was "always a big Bald Bull fan." Writer Jesse Schedeen described him as a "true veteran of the Punch-Out franchise!!", GamePro editors Patrick Shaw and Dave Rudden chose him as one of the four boxers that they most want to return, due to his high number of appearances in the series.

GameDaily listed Bald Bull as the fifth best bald character in video games. Giant Bomb listed him as the fourth character on the "10 Nintendo Characters That Should Be In Smash Before Waluigi" list, on the other hand, Game Informer editor Joe Juba chose him as the ninth character on the "Top 10 Bald Dudes" list. Editor Kevin Wong chose him at # 1 on the "Every Punch-Out!! Opponent, Ranked" list, commenting that "he is the undisputed king of Punch-Out!!" due to his Bull Charge.

UGO.com editors Russell Frushtick and C. Radtke stated "there have been damn good boxing games from EA recently, but nothing comes close to the thrill of knocking out Bald Bull for the first time." Bald Bull is cited as being a difficult opponent in Punch-Out!!. GamesRadar editor Brett Elston suggested that the difficulty of Bald Bull was high enough to make people "swear you’re going to break the controller in half, smash the disc and throw the Wii into the deepest volcano on Earth."

In the game for NES, he has a special attack called "Bull Charge" in which he moves backward, then moves forward and knocks out the player in one hit. However, this attack can be countered, instantly knocking him out instead. In the first fight against Bald Bull, the flash fired by a man in the audience indicates the exact moment Little Mac can counter Bald Bull's attack. This Easter Egg was revealed in 2009 by Makoto Wada in an interview with the former president of Nintendo, Satoru Iwata. Regarding this, Destructoid editor Matthew Razak cursed Makoto Wada  and jokingly demanded that he owes him "two new controllers and a ton of band-aids."

The same effect happens in the second fight against Bald Bull and Piston Honda, however this occurs when a bearded man in the crowd crouches. This version of the trick was discovered in 2016.

Kid Quick 
 is an American boxer from Brooklyn, New York, whose only appearance was in the arcade version of Punch-Out!!. In Punch-Out!! for the Wii, a new character known as "Disco Kid" was included, who is referred to as "Kid Quick" in the game files.

Pizza Pasta 
 is an Italian boxer born in Napoli city, and his only appearance is in the arcade version of Punch-Out!, in which he is the fifth opponent of the game. Kevin Wong found the ridiculousness of the character's name to be the most memorable thing about him, calling it "just incredible; a shining testament to just not giving a shit."

Mr. Sandman 
 is a 31-year-old black boxer from Philadelphia, United States. His first appearance was in Punch-Out!! for the arcades, in which Shigeru Miyamoto designed most of the characters, including him. Later appeared in Punch-Out!! for NES and Super Punch-Out!! for SNES, in thhe latter, He is one of the three boxers returning from the NES Punch-Out!! together with Bald Bull and Super Macho Man. His most recent appearance was in the Wii Punch-Out!!, where he was voiced by Riley Inge, who also voiced Doc Louis in the game. His fighting style is similar to that of Bald Bull, in addition to using jabs, hooks and uppercuts, he has a special attack in which he delivers three consecutive uppercuts that can knock Little Mac down.

GamesRadar editor Brett Elston commented that Mr. Sandman lacked ethnic stereotypes unlike the new character Disco Kid. While most of the opponents contain one or more ethnic or regional stereotypes, Mr. Sandman does not possess any. Since appearing in Punch-Out!! for the arcades, Mr. Sandman has received generally positive reception. GamePro Germany commented that he appeared to be based on boxer Joe Frazier, who also comes from Philadelphia. On a list of "Punch-Out's Toughest Opponents!!" written by Renan Fontes of TheGamer website, he appears in both the sixth and first place on that list.

Opponents introduced in Super Punch-Out!! (1984)

Bear Hugger 

 is a Canadian boxer from Salmon Arm. He first appeared in Super Punch-Out!! for the arcades, and later appeared in Super Punch-Out!! for the Super NES. His most recent appearance is in Punch-Out!! for the Wii, where he was voiced by Richard Newman. Eurogamer described Bear Hugger's attack style as using "sheer force to send opponents to the mat". In their walkthrough, IGN noted that he was fast considering his large size.

Bear Hugger has received mostly positive reception. He has been described as a series favorite by IGN editor Levi Buchanan, and by Official Nintendo Magazine editor Tom East. In their list of the seven best second quests, GamePro listed the Title Defense mode of Punch-Out!! for the Wii, stating that losing to the Glass Joe dressed in a helmet or "squirrel-assisted" Bear Hugger would demonstrate the difficulty and creative talent of the developer Next Level Games. The Escapist editor Greg Tito wrote that he giggled every time Bear Hugger shouted the word "hoser."

GameSpot described him as a "400-pound Canadian who loves maple syrup and little woodland rodents." Game Informer editor Matthew Kato commented on the fact that Bear Hugger trained with real bears. GamesRadar editor Brett Elston in his article on Punch-Out!! stereotypes stated that Bear Hugger embodied several stereotypical Canadian traits, including being husky, loving the outdoors, ice hockey, and drinking maple syrup.  Canadian GamesRadar editor Tyler Wilde jokingly stated that the stereotypes were "absolute malarky", stating that they only consume maple syrup on special occasions, and even then, only from "goose-shaped goblets carved from pine wood".

IGN editor Craig Harris listed him as one of the game's "over-the-top" caricatures. Kotaku editor Michael McWhertor stated that Bear Hugger was "extremely Canadian." The Globe and Mail editor Chad Sapieha, writing about the roster of fighters in Punch-Out!! that "would send chills down the spine of any potential pugilist," mentioned Bear Hugger as one of these boxers, calling him  a "Lumberjack by trade who drinks syrup". In the version of Punch-Out!! released on British home computers in the 1980s as Frank Bruno's Boxing, Bear Hugger is renamed to be 'Canadian Crusher' with reference to his Bear Clap move.

Dragon Chan 
Dragon Chan is a Chinese boxer from Hong Kong, and he can deliver a flying kick that the player must duck in order to avoid being instantly knocked down. He can also attack with a triple kick, which must be dodged to the correct side. In the arcade game Super Punch-Out!!, he is the boxing champion of Hong Kong, while he appears as the second opponent of the Major Circuit in the SNES video game of the same name. In "Frank Bruno's Boxing", Dragon Chan is known as Fling Long Chop and uses the side karate kick.

Soda Popinski 
 is a 35-year-old Soviet-Russian boxer born in Moscow. He first appeared in the 1984 arcade game Super Punch-Out!!, where he was known as Vodka Drunkenski. His home country was originally listed as the USSR in Punch-Out!! video games from the 1980s, but this was changed to Russia in his most recent appearance, the 2009 game Punch-Out!! for the Wii, following the dissolution of the Soviet Union in 1991. 

The character is depicted as a tough Russian man hardened by cold winters and the failings of communism, which is reinforced by his unwieldly drunken antics and his constant drinking from green glass bottles. He has a tall and muscular frame, and red-colored briefs referencing communist symbolism. The character was permanently renamed Soda Popinski for 1987's NES home console game Mike Tyson's Punch-Out!! due to Nintendo of America's stringent censorship policies for the U.S. market, and the bottles he drinks from in-between fights are specifically defined as soda. However, his mid-fight quotes and dialogue are still indicators of his intoxicated behavior. During matches, he attempts to drink from a bottle in order to recover from being knocked down, or sometimes in the middle of the fight to regain health. If the player prevents him from accessing his beverage, he becomes enraged.

Since his 1984 debut in Super Punch-Out!!, Soda Popinski has been a component of discussion about representation and stereotypes in video games. He has appeared in multiple "top" character lists, often with divergent opinions on the appropriateness or effectiveness of his portrayal as a character. 1UP.com and Complex in particular called the character a racist stereotype of a drunken Russian. The Guardian called him a "shamelessly politically incorrect character". and his name change one of Nintendo's "most dramatic" alterations. Reflecting on the name change, GamePro magazine opined that Soda Popinski demonstrated that the notion of political correctness was far less important during the 1980s. GamesRadar editor Brett Elston said that the name "Vodka Drunkenski" seemed intentional because at the time the game was released Russians were portrayed as "anti-American villains". Sumantra Lahiri from The Escapist observed that his soda bottles resemble vodka bottles, and that the origins of Popinski's name change, among other insensitive tropes in the NES game, would certainly offend a modern audience. 

In the character's entry for the 2017 publication 100 Greatest Video Game Characters, Rahima Schwenkbeck compared Soda Popinski to the Street Fighter character Zangief, calling the former "pure stereotype" while the latter is favorably referred to as a "solid character". Schwenkbeck analyzed the Russian tropes being shaped by international relations, in tandem with individual pressures upon Nintendo's developers breaking into the American market. Noting the pervasiveness of the trope in international popular culture, Schwenkbeck pointed out that this is not a phenomenon unique to American media, citing the historically turbulent Japan–Russia relations, and the predominantly negative image of Russia among Japanese society based on the findings of a Pew Research Center survey in 2015. Schwenkbeck observed that Popinski's continued depiction as a caricature of a vodka-loving Russian, regardless of changing political climates and expectations of improved character development with the advancement of technology, reflects a larger narrative about long-standing negative stereotypes of Russians prevalent in both American and Japanese culture.

Soda Popinski has been referenced in popular culture, such as an article by a MTV journalist discussing rapper Papoose. A version of the character appears in an unlicensed Punch-Out!! PC game titled Frank Bruno's Boxing, where he is named "Andra Puncharedov". The character is the namesake of Soda Popinski's bar, located in Nob Hill, San Francisco, California since 2012. The bar's name is an allusion to a "USSR-era Siberian hunting lodge" which references the character's in-universe depiction, and it serves the Vodka Drunkenski which is a "double shot of Russian vodka served neat" was named after his original name.

Great Tiger 
 is a 29-year-old Indian boxer born in Mumbai. He first appeared in Super Punch-Out!! for arcade, and later appeared in Punch-Out!! for the NES. He did not appear in a video game again until 22 years later in Punch-Out!! for the Wii, where was voiced by Sumit Seru. In the NES game, his special attack involves teleporting around the ring, with he does repeatedly. However, at the end of his attack he is unable to move for several seconds due to dizziness, which allows for Little Mac to knock him down with one punch to the head. Great Tiger wears a turban on his head accompanied by a jewel that flashes when he is about to perform an attack. He also uses a flying carpet, and in the NES version, the skin of a Bengal tiger is seen hanging on the post in his corner of the ring. These have all been referred to as stereotypes of Indian people.

Since appearing in Punch-Out!! for the NES, Great Tiger has received mostly positive reception. Both Official Nintendo Magazine and GameSpot described him as a favourite of the series. GamePro listed him as one of the characters who most deserve to return in the Wii Punch-Out!!, stating that "may not be the most PC character from the original NES classic, but his crazy techniques will fit in well with the outlandish style Next Level Games has been known to apply." Great Tiger has been described as a stereotype of Indian people. Freelance writer Sumantra Lahiri, in discussing the stereotypes of Punch-Out!!, stated that it gives players an "encyclopedic knowledge of ignorant American sentiments," mentioning the Indian stereotype that they skin tigers alive and wear turbans.

In his article on the stereotypes of Punch-Out!!, GamesRadar editor Brett Elston stated that Great Tiger embodies several Indian stereotypes, including the ability to fly on magic carpets, living in Taj Mahal-like structures, and that they wear turbans that grant them magical powers. He described him as an "over-caffeinated Jafar", adding that he "plays up in the mystical side of Indian culture so much we’re surprised they didn’t work in a snake charmer joke in there somewhere." Editor Scott Jones stated that in 2009, "fighting a man from India who flies around on a magic carpet and who telegraphs his punches via a glowing jewel in his turban doesn't feel terribly dramatic."

Bit Mob editor Brian Shirk commented that while "Great Tiger looked more human than King Hippo, he still doesn't seem quite human judging by the animal sounds he makes and his teleportation abilities." Davey Nieves of Comics Beat commented that "Decent people in India or Pakistan have been seeing much more offensive stereotypes in the media for years." Reason for which he stated that "looking at Great Tiger with his tiger skin robe dangling behind him like he's opening a nightclub is probably not the worst they've ever seen on a screen." Kakuchopurei included it in his list of the "best Indian characters videogames" citing that "he is a memorable Indian character (thanks to the aforementioned stereotypes)".

Super Macho Man 
 is a 27-year-old American boxer from Hollywood, California. He first appeared in Super Punch-Out!! for the arcades, where he was the final boss of the game. He later took this role again in the Gold version of Punch-Out!!. However, in Mike Tyson's Punch-Out!! he appeared as the penultimate game boss. Macho Man also appeared in Super Punch-Out!! for the SNES, and Punch-Out!! for the Wii, where he was voiced by Mike Inglehart. An ESRB description of Punch-Out!! for the Wii mentioned a boxer who flexed his pectoral muscles and glutes, leading editor Stephen Totilo to question whether this was Super Macho Man or not.

Since appearing in Super Punch-Out!! for the arcades, Super Macho Man has received generally positive reception. He is considered a memorable character of the franchise. Super Macho Man appeared on the cover of an issue of GameFan magazine, GamesRadar editor Chris Antista I include it in the list of the most embarrassing gaming magazine covers. He was described as a "stereotypical and pompous bodybuilder" in Giant Bomb, IGN editor Jesse Schedeen named Super Macho Man one of the series' top fighters, describing him as a "thinly veiled parody mash-up of "Superstar" Billy Graham and another famous fighter who goes by the nickname "Macho Man".

GamesRadar editor Brett Elston states that Super Macho Man embodies the stereotypes of American celebrities of being "too tanned, narcissistic, materialistic, and obsessed with fame, money, and looks." He added that Super Macho Man was not just a parody of celebrities, but "Hollywood and American's fascination with celebrities." In the video game for NES he has two versions of his signature move called Super Spin Punch. One in which he performs a spin after a few seconds to be still and another in which he performs several multiple spins that could instantly knock the player down.

Super Macho Man has achieved internet meme status with the line "Release the Bogus!".

Opponents introduced in Mike Tyson's Punch-Out!! (1987) 
Besides including characters from the original Punch Out!! games, like Glass Joe, the Nintendo Entertainment System game Mike Tyson's Punch-Out!! introduced four new boxers, as well as pulling in real-life boxer Mike Tyson as the final boss of the game.

Von Kaiser 
 (From the Emperor) nicknamed "The German Steel Machine" is a 42 year-old German boxer born in Berlin. He is an instructor of this same sport in an unknown military academy. Von Kaiser made his first appearance in Mike Tyson's Punch-Out!! for the NES in 1987. Years later, he returned in the installment of Punch-Out!! for Wii released in 2009, now voiced by Horst Laxon. In all Punch-Out!! games in which he appears, he is the second opponent Little Mac faces on the Minor Circuit, having a record of 23 wins and 13 losses. In addition, he appeared with Bald Bull in a micro game of WarioWare: Smooth Moves, in which Referee Mario has to count to ten to win the micro game.

The New York Post I call him a "memorable character" alongside Bald Bull and Soda Popinski, Brian Lisi of New York Daily News magazine stated that «Ride of the Valkyries by Wagner made Von Kaiser's entry one of the most memorable in the entire game, far surpassing his staying power in the ring.» When it was revealed that Von Kaiser would be in Punch-Out!! for the Wii, he was rated a "quirky favorite" alongside King Hippo and Doc Louis by the GameZone website. 

Posting and Toasting commented that although he is not the worst fighter of Mike Tyson's Punch-Out!! he claimed that he "is the most forgettable." He further commented that "his look at him, his fighting style and his slapping talk" is "completely unforgettable." The website Paste chose it at the top of their list of "10 video games that let you punch a Nazi." Uproxx rates him as one of the best villains of the series, Cubed3 in their review of the Punch-Out!! for Wii I describe him as a "tough and efficient German." BlockFort listed him at # 7 on their list of "Top 10 Best German Video Game Characters" describing him as a "no-nonsense strongman who looks like a typical German soldier from World War I."

Piston Honda 
 is a 28-year-old Japanese boxer born in Tokyo. He first appeared in Punch-Out!! (NES), where he is the Minor Circuit Champion. He is voiced by Japanese voice actor Kenji Takahashi.

Don Flamenco 
 is a 23-year-old Spanish boxer born in Madrid. His first appearance was in Punch-Out!! for the NES. He did not make another appearance until Punch-Out!! for the Wii, where he was voiced by Juan Amador Pulido.

Since appearing in Punch-Out!! for the NES, Don Flamenco has received mostly positive reception. He was described by IGN editor Levi Buchanan to be one of the favourites of Punch-Out!! with Soda Popinski, Bear Hugger and King Hippo. GameSpy editor Ryan Scott suggested that Don Flamenco existed to "cut the players down to size" after easier opponents such as Glass Joe and Piston Honda. In discussing the stereotypes of Punch-Out!!, GamesRadar editor Brett Elston stated that Don Flamenco was a stereotype of Spanish people, citing stereotypes utilized in the character such as being expert bullfighters, always having a rose in his hand, and an obsession with good looks, comparing Don Flamenco to Spanish fighting game character Vega from the Street Fighter series. Fellow GamesRadar editor Mikel Reparaz held a similar sentiment.

The Escapist editor Sumantra Lahiri commented that while Don Flamenco was less pathetic than French boxer Glass Joe, he «radiates an effeminate "pretty boy" persona by making constant references to his perfect hair and starting off each fight with a feisty Latin dance.» He adds that this is a stereotype of Spanish people by much of the world who view Spain's culture. Eurogamer France considered Flamenco's "macho poses" as a "crude caricature." Brian Lisi of New York Daily Times described him as "a fiery Spaniard with a passion for punches and looks." BlockFort included him in position 6 on their list of the "10 best Spanish video game characters" citing various Spanish stereotypes used in the character.

King Hippo 

 is an obese boxer who hails from the fictional Hippo Island. In the Wii version's title defense, he uses a manhole cover to protect his torso. King Hippo appeared blue in cartoon Captain N: The Game Master, where he is played by Garry Chalk.

Mike Tyson (Mr. Dream) 

 is the final opponent of the original release of Punch-Out!! for the NES, titled Mike Tyson's Punch-Out!!, whom Little Mac faces in a bout called "The Dream Fight", in which his boxing record is 31-0 with 27 KOs. Writer Kevin Wong described him as a "completely broken video game character who can knock you out with a single uppercut," adding that "that's just fun and meaningful when you're fighting Iron Mike himself. With Mr. Dream, it's just pathetic." Writer Jesse Schedeen criticized the character, saying that "he has never given us the same sense of joy and accomplishment."

Opponents introduced in Super Punch-Out!! (1994)

Gabby Jay
 is a 56-year-old French boxer from Paris, whose record is 99 losses and 1 win against Glass Joe. Bit Mob editor Andrew Fitch criticized Gabby Jay, calling him a "wannabe" of Glass Joe. Allgame editor Skyler Miller agreed with this sentiment, commenting that while humorous, he is not quite as "out there". In his article "One and Done: Nine Videogame Characters Who Were Never Heard From Again", editor John Teti listed Gabby Jay, stating that it was "not easy to replace a legend, but that was the bum hand dealt to Gabby Jay". He added that Gabby Jay not appearing in the Wii Punch-Out!! in favor of Glass Joe was something that Star Trek fans would deem "the Dr. Pulaski treatment". Uproxx writer Nathan Birch described him as a "truly consummate coward."

Bob Charlie
 is a 26-year-old boxer from Kingston, Jamaica, whose only appearance was in the SNES version of Super Punch-Out!!. His look and name are both references to the reggae legend Bob Marley. Kevin Wong criticized the character saying that "not only does he suck as a fighter, but he dances during his match while his manager yells 'shuck and jive' at him."

Masked Muscle 
 is a 29-year-old former Luchador masked man from Mexico City, whose only appearance was in Super Punch-Out!!. His main attack is to spit in Little Mac's eyes to temporarily blind him. Writer Kevin Wong described it as "a missed opportunity," commenting that "the developers could have done something really cool with a professional wrestling character, but instead opted for a lazy joke."

Aran Ryan 
 is an Irish boxer born in Dublin. His first appearance was in Super Punch-Out!! for the Super NES, and most recently appeared in the Wii video game Punch-Out!!, where he was voiced by Stephen Webster. While he was more sedate in Super Punch-Out!!, cheating occasionally, the Wii version depicts him as a loud, boisterous cheater. The developer Bryce Holliday describes him as the game's "resident hooligan". In discussing Ryan's fighting style, GamePro editor Will Herring described it as being momentum-based.

Since appearing in Punch-Out!!, Aran Ryan has received mixed reception. In their review, GameTrailers bemoaned his inclusion over Super Punch-Out!! character Dragon Chan. In his review, editor Scott Jones criticized Ryan's inclusion in the Wii Punch-Out!!, calling him "one of the most banal characters in the game." He questioned why Nintendo included him and called him "forgettable." Complex ranked him as the "sixth-douchiest video game character."

In their article of racial stereotypes in Punch-Out!!, GamesRadar editor Brett Elston commented that his uncontrollable rage, his disposition to cheating, his love for fighting, and his penchant for adorning his clothing with four-leaf clovers was a strong stereotype of the Irish people. They added other qualities of Irish stereotypes, which includes red hair and excitability. GamesRadar editor Michael Grimm listed him as one of the six most offensive Irish stereotypes describing him as a "babbling madman". Eurogamer editor Oli Welsh cited Ryan as a "idiotically violent Irishman."

Heike Kagero 
 is a 19-year-old Japanese boxer born in Osaka. His only appearance in the SNES version of Super Punch-Out!!. In addition to his punches, he uses his long silver hair as a weapon by employing a hair whip maneuver which can knock down the player if hit with it.

Mad Clown 
 is a 27-year-old Italian clown from Milan who decided to take up boxing. He made his only appearance in the SNES version of Super Punch-Out!!. Mad Clown began his life as a famous opera singer, however he suffered from a nervous breakdown. Later he dedicated himself to being a clown, and after failing at that as well, he decided to dedicate himself to boxing.

Narcis Prince 
 is a 20-year-old British boxer from London that appeared for the first and last time in the SNES video game Super Punch-Out!!. Kevin Wong commented on this by saying that "the privileged handsome boy from across the pond definitely has the most elegant boxing style of all the fighters in Super Punch-Out!!."

Hoy Quarlow 
 is an 78-year-old Chinese boxer born on Beijing, whose first and last appearance was in Super Punch-Out!! for SNES. Hoy Quarlow is the only boxer who carries a weapon in his hands, in this case a stick, he also has a "sick arsenal of special moves". Also, he only weighs 100 pounds.

Rick Bruiser 
 is a boxer and brother of Nick Bruiser. Rick has 41 wins on his record and 1 loss from his brother. Both Rick and Nick can use the "Arm Breaker", a special move in which they both nudge that temporarily takes Little Mac's left or right arm out of action.

Nick Bruiser 
 is the final opponent of the game, and holds a record of 42 wins and 0 losses. According to a Nintendo Power magazine, he lost once against Glass Joe (hence Glass Joe's only win), but the SNES game denies this.

Opponents introduced in Punch-Out!! (2009)

Disco Kid 
 is a 20-year-old American boxer from Brooklyn, New York. who was voiced by Donny Lucas. Disco Kid is one of only two new characters to appear in the Wii video game Punch-Out!!, which consists of mostly characters from Punch-Out!! for the Nintendo Entertainment System. He was one of the first characters revealed in the Wii Punch-Out!!. He is characterized as flamboyant with a high-pitched voice and an affinity for clubbing.

Disco Kid has received generally positive reception. Numerous critics said that Disco Kid fit in well with the characters returning from previous games, including Craig Harris, Oli Welsh, Ricardo Madeira, and DJPubba. GameSpot's Tom Mc Shea believed that he lacked the charm of the returning characters but had a flashy style. The Escapist's John Funk said that more could have been done to make him feel "disco", such as the addition of "sequins on his shorts." 1UP.com's David Ellis and an editor for ESPN.com compared Disco Kid to The Fresh Prince of Bel-Air character Carlton Banks; Ellis added that he was a "flamboyant dancer who uses awkward timing as a distraction" and a greater challenge than other early game characters due to his unique pattern. GamePros Will Herring wrote that his design was "masterfully modeled and animated". GameDaily's Chris Buffa described him as a "dancing fool" and a humorous character with a distinctive personality.

Disco Kid has been described as flamboyant, and as a stereotype of black Americans by critics such as Kotaku's Michael McWhertor. An editor for GameTrailers suggested that Nintendo was aiming for a certain segment of people with Disco Kid. GamesRadar's Brett Elston described Disco Kid as a stereotype due to his appreciation of cars, bass, and clubbing. He believed that these stereotypes were comparatively mild compared to other Punch-Out!! characters, with the exception of Mr. Sandman. One of the members of Retronauts stated that Disco Kid was stereotype new to Punch-Out!!, and that it was "unnerving."

Opponents' appearances

Cameo characters
Punch-Out!! has several cameos of Nintendo characters. The original Punch-Out!! shows several Nintendo characters in the audience, including Donkey Kong Jr. and Mario, and Mario appears as a referee in the NES Punch-Out!!. In Punch-Out!! for the Wii, Donkey Kong appears as an opponent, and otherwise his shadow is generally seen behind the opponent and to the left in the audience.

Merchandise
Topps and Nintendo of America made a series of trading cards featuring characters from the Mario, The Legend of Zelda, Double Dragon, and the NES Punch-Out!! series. The Punch-Out!! cards depict Little Mac's various opponents. The cards have scratch-off spots on them, which determine loss or win. As in real boxing, but not in this video game series, a "cow blow" is slang for the highly illegal blow to the kidneys and causes the scratch-off card to be an instant loss.

Notes

References

Punch-Out